Henry Griffith may refer to:

Henry W. Griffith (1897–1956), New York state senator
Henry Griffith (priest) (1850–1932), Archdeacon of Lahore
Sir Henry Griffith, 1st Baronet (died c. 1640), of the Griffith baronets
Sir Henry Griffith, 2nd Baronet (died 1656), of the Griffith baronets
Henry Griffith, owner of Beaumont College
Lt. Col. Henry Griffith, see Order of Battle at the Balaclava campaign

See also

Harry Griffith (disambiguation)
Henry Griffiths (disambiguation)